Éric Humbertclaude (born 5 May 1961) is a French musician, organist, contemporary composer, writer and essayist, musicologist, researcher specializing in contemporary music and pipe organ music.

Biography 
Born in the Vosges département, Éric Humbertclaude spent his child youth in La Bresse in the same département. He made contact with music as an instrumentalist of the municipal harmony of the commune then was introduced to the pipe organ of the Saint Laurent church.

As an adult, he left his native region for Paris. At 21, he became an organist as occasional replacement of Léon Souberbielle at the organ of the choir of the Église de la Trinité, while attending the organ class of André Fleury at the Schola Cantorum de Paris. At the same time, he turned to contemporary music and, since the 1980s, frequented spectral composers such as Tristan Murail, Gérard Grisey and Hugues Dufourt.

Interested in contemporary composition, he developed a computer platform to help with composition and wrote several books on musical creation. He wrote the first synthesis on the thought of Pierre Boulez and rediscovered the life and work of the musicographer Pyotr Suvchinsky, 5 October 1892 in St-Petersburg – 24 January 1985 in Paris.

In 2013, he returned to his favorite instrument, the organ, for which he was preparing a project to create a new instrument, the 2020 organ, "adapted to modern times".

As of 2017, he prepares the edition of the complete works, which he found, of the organist and composer Jean-Claude Touche (1926–1944), killed at a very young age by a German bullet at the end of the Second World War.

Literary style 
Christine Labroche describes Éric Humberclaude's style as "sometimes complex or poetically elliptical and of dense prose complicated by the very dense notes provided at the foot of the page, almost a work in itself", and specifies that "it is clearly aimed at a cultured public who holds certain keys in advance and who takes an intellectual pleasure in the relative esotericism but sought out purpose." She notes that "one nevertheless feels in filigree a permanent conviction, a sincerity without fault and a completely refreshing commitment ".

Publications 
 Essays on music and creation
 Le reflet d'une oreille, in 20eme siècle : images de la musique française : textes et entretiens, Sacem/Papiers, 1986 (réimpression anastatique dans Hugues Dufourt : un univers bruissant, cf. infra) ;
 Les modèles perceptuels par simulation instrumentale dans les œuvres de Tristan Murail, Dissonance, No 13, Lausanne, 1987 (reissue: La Revue musicale, Paris, 1991) ;
 (Re)lire Souvtchinski, texts chosen by Eric Humbertclaude, La Bresse : E. Humbertclaude, 1990, 301 p.  ;
 The Challenge of Tristan Murail's Work, Homestudio, revue Audiolab, Free, 1999 read online ;
 La transcription dans Boulez et Murail : de l’oreille à l’éveil, L’Harmattan, Univers musical, 1999, 98 p.  ;
 Empreintes : regards sur la création musicale contemporaine, L’Harmattan, Univers musical, 2009, 82 p.  ;
 La liberté dans la musique (Beethoven, Souvtchinski, Boulez), Aedam Musicae, 2012, ;
 La musique, les pieds sur terre, Aedam Musicae, 2012 (text appeared in "La liberté dans la musique") ;
 Hugues Dufourt : un univers bruissant, L’Harmattan, Univers musical, 2012, 74 p.  ;
 La création à vif : musique & corps en éveil, coauthor: Fabienne Gotusso, L'Harmattan, Univers musical, 2013, 102 p.  ;
Collective Essay
 Pierre Souvtchinski, cahiers d’étude, under the direction of Éric Humbertclaude. [Authors:] Konrad Walterskirchen (Austria), Elena Poldiaeva (Russia) and Sergei Glebov (USA), L’Harmattan, Univers musical, 2006, 238 p. 

Tales
 Federico Gualdi à Venise : Fragments retrouvés (1660-1678) : recherches sur un exploitant minier alchimiste, L’Harmattan, 2010, 368 p.  read online ;
 Récréations de Hultazob, L’Harmattan, Écritures, 2010, 96 p.  ;

Poetry
 Joue, je pense à toi, L’Harmattan, Accent tonique, Poésie, 2011, 60 p.  ;
 Bascule followed by Vulnus, L’Harmattan, Écritures, 2012, 90 p.  ;

 Éditions L'Harmattan
 Écrit la nuit. Rencontre avec les créateurs ;
 Échos en jachère ;

Musical transcriptions (sheet music)
 Johannes Brahms, Trois Préludes posthumous opus 122 for Sextet (vents et cordes), transcription de chorals pour orgue, Aedam Musicae, 2010 ;
 Jean-François Tapray, Cinq pièces inédites pour orgue, Delatour, 2015 ;
 Jean-Claude Touche, Œuvres complètes
 
 Produit multimédia sur l'orgue
 Le Grand-Orgue de la Basilique St-Pierre et St-Paul de Luxeuil-les-Bains, cointerpreter: Pierre Doillon

Bibliography 
  ;
  ;
  ;
  ;
  ;
  ;
  ;
  ;
  ;
  ;

References

External links  
 Bibliographie d'Éric Humbertclaude sur le portail de la musique contemporaine en France - French Gateway to Contemporary Music Resources

21st-century French composers
21st-century French musicologists
French classical organists
French male organists
21st-century French non-fiction writers
1961 births
People from Saint-Dié-des-Vosges
Living people
21st-century organists
21st-century French male musicians
Male classical organists